Peek'n Peak Resort and Spa is ski resort in southwestern New York in Chautauqua County. The resort is located at the western end of the ski country snowbelt. Peek'n Peak opened in 1964. The lodge was built in the Tudor style architecture style.  Peek'n Peak has 27 skiing and snowboarding trails as well as a 36-hole golf course.  In 2007 Peek'n Peak opened "The Spa at Peek'n Peak".

Peek'n Peak also hosts the annual Peek'n Peak Classic golf tournament.

In June 2010, Peek'n Peak filed for Chapter 11 bankruptcy, which the parent company attributes to the death of a co-owner. On August 24, 2011, the resort was purchased by Scott Enterprises, in an auction.

References

External links
Peek'n Peak Website

Ski areas and resorts in New York (state)
Sports venues in Chautauqua County, New York
1964 establishments in New York (state)